Joseph Randall Redfield (born January 14, 1961, in Doylestown, Pennsylvania) is an American former professional baseball third baseman. He is an alumnus of the University of California, Santa Barbara.

Career
Drafted by the New York Mets in the 9th round of the 1982 Major League Baseball draft, Redfield would make his MLB debut with the California Angels on June 4, 1988, and appear in his final game on July 15, 1991.

External links

1961 births
Living people
American expatriate baseball players in Canada
Baseball players from Pennsylvania
Buffalo Bisons (minor league) players
California Angels players
Charlotte O's players
Denver Zephyrs players
Edmonton Trappers players
Jackson Mets players
Little Falls Mets players
Lynchburg Mets players
Major League Baseball third basemen
Midland Angels players
Pittsburgh Pirates players
Scranton/Wilkes-Barre Red Barons players
Sportspeople from Bucks County, Pennsylvania
Tidewater Tides players
UC Santa Barbara Gauchos baseball players
Mat-Su Miners players